Adler & Sullivan was an architectural firm founded by Dankmar Adler and Louis Sullivan in Chicago. Among its projects was the multi-purpose Auditorium Building in Chicago and the Wainwright Building skyscraper in St Louis. In 1883 Louis Sullivan was added to Adler's architectural firm, creating the Adler & Sullivan partnership. According to Architect Ward Miller:

Adler, with his engineering prowess and facility with acoustics became seen as the business genius of the partnership, while Sullivan, known for his great design talent, is recounted as the artist.

Selected commissions
 Ann Halsted House, Chicago, Illinois, 1883
 Halsted Row Houses, Chicago, Illinois, 1884
 Leon Mannheimer House, Chicago, Illinois, 1884
 Joseph Deimel House, Chicago, Illinois, 1886
 Auditorium Building, Chicago, Illinois 1889
 Pueblo Opera House, Pueblo, Colorado,  1890
 Carrie Eliza Getty Tomb, Graceland Cemetery, Chicago, 1890
 Wainwright Building, St. Louis, Missouri,  1891
 Vacation Home for James & Helen Charnley, Ocean Spring, MS, 1891
 Vacation Home For Sullivan, Ocean Springs, MS, 1891
 Charnley Residence, Chicago, IL, 1892
 Albert Sullivan Residence 4575 South Lake Park Avenue, Chicago, IL, 1892
 Union Trust Building , St. Louis (1893; street-level ornament heavily altered in 1924)
 Prudential (Guaranty) Building, Buffalo, New York, 1894
 Chicago Stock Exchange Building, Chicago,  1894

Sources

Defunct architecture firms based in Chicago
Chicago school architects
Design companies established in 1883
American companies established in 1883
American companies disestablished in 1899
1883 establishments in Illinois
1899 disestablishments in Illinois
19th-century American architects